In mathematics, an induced character is the character of the representation V of a finite group G induced from a representation W of a subgroup H ≤ G.  More generally, there is also a notion of induction  of a class function f on H given by the formula

If f is a character of the representation W of H, then this formula for  calculates the character of the induced representation V of G.

The basic result on induced characters is Brauer's theorem on induced characters. It states that every irreducible character on G is a linear combination with integer coefficients of characters induced from elementary subgroups.

References 

Group theory